

"Haswell-WS" (22 nm) 
 All models support: MMX, SSE, SSE2, SSE3, SSSE3, SSE4.1, SSE4.2, AVX, AVX2, FMA3, F16C, BMI1 (Bit Manipulation Instructions1), BMI2, Enhanced Intel SpeedStep Technology (EIST), Intel 64, XD bit (an NX bit implementation), TXT, Intel vPro, Intel VT-x, Intel VT-d, Hyper-threading (except E3-1220 v3, E3-1225 v3 and E3-1226 v3), Turbo Boost 2.0, AES-NI, Smart Cache, TSX, ECC, Intel x8 SDDC

 Xeon E3-12xx v3 (uniprocessor) 

 "Haswell-EN" (22 nm) Entry 

 All models support: MMX, SSE, SSE2, SSE3, SSSE3, SSE4.1, SSE4.2, AVX, F16C, Enhanced Intel SpeedStep Technology (EIST), Intel 64, XD bit (an NX bit implementation), TXT, Intel VT-x, Intel EPT, Intel VT-d, Intel VT-c, Intel x8 SDDC, Hyper-threading, Turbo Boost (except E5-2408 v3 and E5-2418L v3), AES-NI, Smart Cache. Support for up to six DIMMs of DDR3 memory per CPU socket.

 Xeon E5-14xx v3 (uniprocessor) 

 Xeon E5-24xx v3 (dual-processor) 

 "Haswell-EP" (22 nm) Efficient Performance 
 All models support: MMX, SSE, SSE2, SSE3, SSSE3, SSE4.1, SSE4.2, AVX, AVX2, FMA3, F16C, Enhanced Intel SpeedStep Technology (EIST), Intel 64, XD bit (an NX bit implementation), Intel VT-x, Intel EPT, Intel VT-d, Hyper-threading (except E5-1603 v3, E5-1607 v3, E5-2603 v3, E5-2609 v3, E5-2628 v3, E5-2663 v3, E5-2685 v3 and E5-4627 v3), Turbo Boost 2.0 (except E5-1603 v3, E5-1607 v3, E5-2603 v3, E5-2608L v3, E5-2609 v3 and E5-4610 v3), AES-NI, Smart Cache. Transistors: Up to 8 cores: 2.60 billion, Up to 12 cores: 3.84 billion,  Up to 18 cores: 5.69 billion
 Die size: Up to 8 cores: 354 mm², Up to 12 cores: 492 mm²,  Up to 18 cores: 662 mm²
 Support for up to 12 DIMMs of DDR4 memory per CPU socket (E5-2629 v3, 2649 v3 and 2669 v3, E5-2678 v3, also support DDR3 memory).

 Xeon E5-16xx v3 (uniprocessor) 

 Xeon E5-26xx v3 (dual-processor) 

 Xeon E5-46xx v3 (quad-processor) 

 "Haswell-EX" (22 nm) Expandable 
 All models support: MMX, SSE, SSE2, SSE3, SSSE3, SSE4.1, SSE4.2, AVX, AVX2, FMA3, F16C, Enhanced Intel SpeedStep Technology (EIST), Intel 64, XD bit (an NX bit implementation), Intel VT-x, Intel VT-d, Hyper-threading, Turbo Boost 2.0 (except E7-4809 v3 and 4820 v3), AES-NI, Smart Cache.''
 Transistors: Up to 18 cores: 5.69 billion
 Die size: Up to 18 cores: 662 mm²
 Support for up to 24 DIMMs of DDR3 or DDR4 memory per CPU socket.

Xeon E7-48xx v3 (quad-processor)

Xeon E7-88xx v3 (octa-processor)

References 

Intel Xeon (Haswell)